Atalante (minor planet designation: 36 Atalante) is a large, dark main-belt asteroid. It was discovered by the German-French astronomer H. Goldschmidt on October 5, 1855, and named by French mathematician Urbain Le Verrier after the Greek mythological heroine Atalanta (of which Atalante is the French and German form, pronounced nearly the same as 'Atalanta' in English). It was rendered 'Atalanta' in English sources in the 19th century. The asteroid is also classified as a C-type one, according to the Tholen classification system.

During this interval, the magnitude varies by an amplitude of 0.12 ± 0.02. By combining the results of multiple light curves, the approximate ellipsoidal shape of the object can be estimated. It appears to be slightly elongated, being about 28.2% longer along one axis compared to the other two. Atalante was observed by Arecibo radar in October 2010.

This asteroid shares a mean-motion resonance with the planets Jupiter and Saturn. The computed Lyapunov time for this asteroid is only 4,000 years, indicating that it occupies a highly chaotic orbit that will change randomly over time because of gravitational perturbations of the planets. This is the shortest Lyapunov time of the first 100 named asteroids.

References

External links 
 Lightcurve plot of 36 Atalante, Palmer Divide Observatory, B. D. Warner (2007)
 Asteroid Lightcurve Database (LCDB), query form (info )
 Dictionary of Minor Planet Names, Google books
 Asteroids and comets rotation curves, CdR – Observatoire de Genève, Raoul Behrend
 Discovery Circumstances: Numbered Minor Planets (1)-(5000) – Minor Planet Center
 
 

Background asteroids
Atalante
Atalante
C-type asteroids (Tholen)
18551005